Lokhvitsky Uyezd (Лохвицкий уезд) was one of the subdivisions of the Poltava Governorate of the Russian Empire. It was situated in the northern part of the governorate. Its administrative centre was Lokhvitsa (Lokhvytsia).

Demographics
At the time of the Russian Empire Census of 1897, Lokhvitsky Uyezd had a population of 150,985. Of these, 95.8% spoke Ukrainian, 3.1% Yiddish, 0.9% Russian and 0.1% Belarusian as their native language.

References

 
Uezds of Poltava Governorate
Poltava Governorate